Richard Thomas Gough  (April–June 1859 – 2 February 1934) was an English Wales international footballer. He was part of the Wales national football team, playing 1 match on 12 March 1883 against Scotland.

Football career

Tom Gough played for Oswestry Town between 1877–1887. He first played as a half-back before eventually becoming a goalkeeper. He won the Welsh Cup with Oswestry (then named Oswestry White Star) in 1884.

After retiring from playing he became a referee, and took charge of two international games.

He also became president of the Shropshire FA.

In 1911 he became president of the Football Association of Wales.

Cricket career

Gough was also a cricketer who played at county level for Shropshire between 1884 and 1903 and at club level for Oswestry. Two brothers, Walter George (1857-1908) and Herbert (Bert) Gough (1873-1954) also played at both levels.

Honours
Oswestry
Welsh Cup Winner: 1884

See also
 List of Wales international footballers (alphabetical)

References

1859 births
1934 deaths
Welsh footballers
Wales international footballers
Place of birth missing
Association football goalkeepers